Rahul Siddhvinayak Bondre is a member of the 13th Maharashtra Legislative Assembly. He represents the Chikhali Assembly Constituency. He belongs to the Indian National Congress.

References

Maharashtra MLAs 2014–2019
People from Buldhana district
Living people
Marathi politicians
Year of birth missing (living people)
Indian National Congress politicians from Maharashtra